Guy Melamed (born 21 December 1992) is an Israeli professional footballer who plays for Israeli Premier League club Bnei Sakhnin.

Early life
Melamed was born in Ra'anana, Israel, to a Sephardic Jewish family.

Career
On 5 October 2020, Melamed joined St Johnstone on a free transfer, signing a one-year deal. Melamed left St Johnstone at the end of his contract in June 2021 after having played a key role for the Perth club as they landed an historic cup double.

In August 2021, Melamed returned to his native country, signing for Bnei Sakhnin in the Israeli Premier League.

Career statistics

Honours

Club
Hapoel Be'er Sheva
Israeli Premier League: 2017–18

St Johnstone
Scottish Cup: 2020–21
Scottish League Cup: 2020–21

External links

References

1992 births
Living people
Israeli Sephardi Jews
Israeli footballers
Hapoel Kfar Saba F.C. players
Maccabi Petah Tikva F.C. players
Maccabi Herzliya F.C. players
Hapoel Be'er Sheva F.C. players
St Johnstone F.C. players
Bnei Sakhnin F.C. players
Liga Leumit players
Israeli Premier League players
Scottish Professional Football League players
Israel international footballers
Footballers from Ra'anana
Association football forwards
Israeli expatriate footballers
Expatriate footballers in Scotland
Israeli expatriate sportspeople in Scotland